Where the Worst Begins is a 1925 American silent Western film directed by John McDermott and starring Ruth Roland, Alec B. Francis, and Matt Moore.

Plot
As described in a film magazine review, a young woman living on a ranch longs to go East, so to obtain money to make the trip kidnaps the son of a wealthy Eastern couple vacationing in the West and holds him for ransom. After the capture, love interest develops between the young people, and the complications that ensue are numerous but are happily terminated.

Cast

References

Bibliography
 Langman, Larry. A Guide to Silent Westerns. Greenwood Publishing Group, 1992.

External links

1925 films
1925 Western (genre) films
American black-and-white films
Films directed by John McDermott
Silent American Western (genre) films
1920s English-language films
1920s American films